Mena is a small town and seat of the commune of N'Dolondougou in the Cercle of Dioila in the Koulikoro Region of south-western Mali.

References

Populated places in Koulikoro Region